The Research Center for Anthropology and Comparative Sociology or LESC (Laboratoire d'ethnologie et de sociologie comparative - LESC) is a cross-faculty research entity of the Paris West University Nanterre La Défense and the National Center for Scientific Research (CNRS)

The French School of Anthropology 

The center was founded in 1967 at Paris X University by Eric de Dampierre, and associated with the National Scientific Research Council (CNRS) from 1968. In 1989 it became a Mixed Research Unit (UMR). Today it is the UMR 7186.

Activities 
The spectrum of research activities covered by the LESC is quite vast, reaching from traditional fieldwork based ethnography to visual anthropology. 
These activities are conducted mainly within the three scientific research departments:
 Technology
 Americanism
 Ethnomusicology

Learned societies 
They are two learned societies housed in the LESC.
 The Société d'ethnologie, created in 1986 by Eric de Dampierre.
 The Société des africanistes, created in 1930.

Anthropology library 
The Library named after Eric de Dampierre has one of the largest collection of anthropological reviews and files on Africanist, Americanist and Mongol studies in France.

Scientific publications 
 the Ateliers du LESC, is the electronic publication of the laboratory, available free and online on Revues.org, the French public open source science portal.
 Journal des africanistes published by the société des africanistes since 1931

See also
 French Anthropology
 Paris West University Nanterre La Défense
 National Center for Scientific Research
 , Nanterre

References

External links
 LESC Official website in English
 LESC Official website in French

Research institutes in France
Social science institutes
French National Centre for Scientific Research